Naila is a town in the Frankenwald hills, in the Hof district of Bavaria.

History
The earliest documentation of Naila dates at 9 January 1343. The first settlements in the area around Naila probably happened between the 12th and 14th century. The name Naila first appeared as "Neulins" (and variations thereof), has its origins most likely in the meaning "Small new settlement". In 1454, Naila was awarded a coat of arms by its overlord, Margrave John.

After a brief episode under Prussian reign (1792–1810), Naila was included into the newly-established Kingdom of Bavaria. In 1818, it was awarded town privileges and in 1886, a railroad station was opened in Naila.

The town was the seat of the then district of Naila until this was merged into Hof district in 1972, and had to give up their number-plate code NAI in favour of HO. The villages of Marxgrün, Lippertsgrün and Marlesreuth were incorporated to Naila in 1978.

In 1979, Naila was the landing site of the Strelzyk and Wetzel families' famous homemade hot-air balloon escape from East Germany.

Mayors

 1906–1919: Wilhelm Hagen
 1919–1926: Heinrich Kanzler
 1926–1933: Julius Borger
 1933-1933: Ludwig Wunner
 1933–1945: Karl Jakob Schmidt
 1945–1945: Georg Fugmann
 1945–1948: Heinrich Lang senior
 1948–1952: Christian Schlicht
 1952–1953: Georg Fugmann
 1953–1956: Karl Otto Zander
 1956–1959: Hilmar Jahn
 1960–1964: Fritz Jahn
 1964–1968: Hans Künzel
 1968–1972: Albin Bischoff
 1972–1996: Robert Strobel
 1996–2001: Hannsjürgen Lommer
 2001- : Frank Stumpf

Population development
The numbers are with the incorporated districts.

Personalities 
 Emre Dönmez (born 1996), screenwriter, photographer and movie critic
 Hans-Peter Friedrich (born 1957), jurist, CSU politician, Member of Bundestag since 1998, Federal Ministry of the Interior 2011-2013

See also
 Franconian Forest
 Wild man
 Höllental

External links 
  
 History of the city-seal 
 Description of the balloon-escape from the GDR

References

Hof (district)